A Dark Enchanted Crystal Night is the first full-length album by the power metal band Crystallion.

Track listing
	A Dark Enchanted Crystal Night - 0:55
	Guardians of the Sunrise - 5:17
	Visions - 8:05
	Eternia - 6:42
	Crystal Clear - 6:13
	Tears in the Rain - 7:00
	Dragonheart - 8:20
	Burning Bridges - 6:46
	The Final Revelation - 9:11

2006 albums
Crystallion albums